Dyanne Thorne (October 14, 1936 – January 28, 2020) was an American actress, stage performer and vocalist. She was known for her stage work in Las Vegas and as the lead actress in the Ilsa film franchise which began with Ilsa, She Wolf of the SS (1975).

Early life and education
Born in Park Ridge, New Jersey, as Dorothy Ann Seib, and raised there primarily by her mother, she attended Park Ridge High School, where she was one of the feature writers on the school newspaper.

After graduating, she attended New York University and took acting courses with Uta Hagen.

Career
Dyanne Thorne began her career in show business as a band vocalist and New York stage actress. She also worked as a comedic sketch artist/talking foil. Comedy albums, with Allen & Rossi, Vaughn Meader and Lohman & Barkley, earned her appearances on many TV variety shows such as The Tonight Show, Red Skelton, Steve Allen, Merv Griffin, and with Tim Conway at Caesars Palace hotel in Las Vegas.

Filmed in New York City, Thorne's first major film role was in Norman Chaitin's short Encounter (1965), which was also an early screen credit for Robert De Niro. Moving to Hollywood to appear in Star Trek, and star as another villainess in Crown International's thriller Point of Terror (1971), led to further film roles.

In 1975, Thorne married composer, conductor, musician and actor Howard Maurer. The couple subsequently starred in five films together, co-produced and starred in several Las Vegas Strip showroom productions and their careers took them around the world.

As an actress, Thorne was known for her characterisation of the heinous international dominatrix and soldier of fortune "Ilsa". After her debut as Ilsa in Ilsa, She Wolf of the SS (1975), she reprised the role in the sequels Ilsa, Harem Keeper of the Oil Sheiks (1976), Ilsa, the Tigress of Siberia and an unofficial entry Greta, the Mad Butcher (both 1977), the last directed by Jess Franco.

Later years
Thorne started but did not complete studies for a degree in anthropology. She claimed to have earned a degree in comparative religion over the course of ten years of study.

As church ordained, non-denominational ministers by Science of Mind, Thorne and husband Howard founded "A Scenic Outdoor Wedding" as an alternative to commercial chapel weddings.

Death
Thorne died in Las Vegas on January 28, 2020, from pancreatic cancer at the age of 83.

Filmography

Television

Films

References

External links

 

1936 births
2020 deaths
20th-century American actresses
21st-century American actresses
Actresses from Connecticut
Actresses from New Jersey
American female adult models
American film actresses
Deaths from cancer in Nevada
Deaths from pancreatic cancer
New York University alumni
Park Ridge High School alumni
People from Greenwich, Connecticut
People from Park Ridge, New Jersey
Religious Science clergy
Method actors